Cambusnethan railway station served the village of Cambusnethan, North Lanarkshire, Scotland, from 1901 to 1917 on the Wishaw, Cambusnethan and Coltness Railway.

History 
The station was opened on 1 October 1901 by the Caledonian Railway. To the west was the goods yard and at the west end of the platform was the signal box. The station closed on 1 January 1917.

References 

Disused railway stations in North Lanarkshire
Former Caledonian Railway stations
Railway stations in Great Britain opened in 1901
Railway stations in Great Britain closed in 1917
1901 establishments in Scotland
1917 disestablishments in Scotland